A visual search engine is a search engine designed to search for information on the World Wide Web through the input of an image or a search engine with a visual display of the search results. Information may consist of web pages, locations, other images and other types of documents. This type of search engines is mostly used to search on the mobile Internet through an image of an unknown object (unknown search query). Examples are buildings in a foreign city. These search engines often use techniques for Content Based Image Retrieval.

A visual search engine searches images, patterns based on an algorithm which it could recognize and gives relative information based on the selective or apply pattern match technique.

Classification 
Depending on the nature of the search engine there are two main groups, those which aim to find visual information  and those with a visual display of results.

Visual information searchers

Image search 
An image search engine is a search engine that is designed to find an image. The search can be based on keywords, a picture, or a web link to a picture. The results depend on the search criterion, such as metadata, distribution of color, shape, etc., and the search technique which the browser uses.

Image search techniques 
Two techniques currently used in image search:

Search by metadata: Image search is based on comparison of metadata associated with the image as keywords, text, etc.. and it is obtained a set of images sorted by relevance. The metadata associated with each image can reference the title of the image, format, color, etc.. and can be generated manually or automatically. This metadata generation process is called audiovisual indexing.

Search by example: In this technique, also called reverse image search, the search results are obtained through the comparison between images using content-based image retrieval computer vision techniques. During the search it is examined the content of the image such as color, shape, texture or any visual information that can be extracted from the image. This system requires a higher computational complexity, but is more efficient and reliable than search by metadata.

There are image searchers that combine both search techniques, as the first search is done by entering a text, and then, from the images obtained can refine the search using as search parameters the images which appear as a result.

Video search 
A video search engine is a search engine designed to search video on the net. Some video searchers process the search directly in the Internet, while others shelter the videos from which the search is done. Some searchers also enable to use as search parameters the format or the length of the video. Usually the results come with a miniature capture of the video.

Video search techniques 
Currently, almost all video searchers are based on keywords (search by metadata) to perform searches. These keywords can be found in the title of the video, text accompanying the video or can be defined by the author. An example of this type of search is YouTube.

3D Models searcher 
A searcher of 3D models aims to find the file of a 3D modeling object from a database or network. At first glance the implementation of this type of searchers may seem unnecessary, but due to the continuous documentary inflation of the Internet, every day it becomes more necessary indexing information.

3D Models search techniques 

These have been used with traditional text-based searchers (keywords / tags), where the authors of the indexed material, or Internet users, have contributed these tags or keywords.  Because it is not always effective, it has recently been investigated in the implementation of search engines that combine the search using text with the search compared to 2D drawings, 3D drawings and 3D models.

Princeton University has developed a search engine that combines all these parameters to perform the search, thus increasing the efficiency of search.
Also, 3DfindIT.com portal provides 3D models search engine based on sketch, drawings, text, etc.
https://www.3dfindit.com/

Mobile visual search 
A mobile image searcher is a type of search engine designed exclusively for mobile phones, through which you can find any information on Internet, through an image made with the own mobile phone or using certain words (keywords). Mobile Visual Search solutions enable you to integrate image recognition software capabilities into your own branded mobile applications. Mobile Visual Search (MVS) bridges the gap between online and offline media, enabling you to link your customers to digital content.

Introduction 
Mobile phones have evolved into powerful image and video processing devices equipped with high-resolution cameras, color displays, and hardware-accelerated graphics. They are also increasingly equipped with a global positioning system and connected to broadband wireless networks. All this enables a new class of applications that use the camera phone to initiate search queries about objects in visual proximity to the user (Figure 1). Such applications can be used, e.g., for identifying products, comparison shopping, finding information about movies, compact disks (CDs), real estate, print media, or artworks.

Process 
Typically, this type of search engine uses techniques of query by example or Image query by example, which use the content, shape, texture and color of the image to compare them in a database and then deliver the approximate results from the query.

The process used in these searches in the mobile phones is as follows:

First, the image is sent to the server application. Already on the server, the image will be analyzed by different analytical teams, as each one is specialized in different fields that make up an image. Then, each team will decide if the submitted image contains the fields of their speciality or not.

Once this whole procedure is done, a central computer will analyze the data and create a page of the results sorted with the efficiency of each team, to eventually be sent to the mobile phone.

References

Information retrieval genres
Internet search engines
Multimedia
Image search